Carnoy-Mametz is a commune in the Somme department in Hauts-de-France in northern France. It was established on 1 January 2019 by merger of the former communes of Mametz (the seat) and Carnoy.

See also
Communes of the Somme department

References

Communes of Somme (department)
Communes nouvelles of Somme
Populated places established in 2019
2019 establishments in France